Sabine Katharina Weiss (born 26 May 1958) is a German lawyer and politician of the Christian Democratic Union (CDU) who has been serving as a member of the Bundestag from the state of North Rhine-Westphalia since 2009. 

In addition to her parliamentary mandate, Weiss served as Parliamentary State Secretary at the Federal Ministry of Health under minister Jens Spahn in the government of Chancellor Angela Merkel from 2018 until 2021.

Early life and career 
Born in Duisburg, North Rhine-Westphalia, Weiss studied law at Ruhr University Bochum.

Political career 
Weiss first became a member of the Bundestag in the 2009 German federal election. In her first term from 2009 until 2013, she served on the Committee on Petitions; the Committee on Economic Cooperation and Development; the Subcommittee on Health in Developing Countries; and the Subcommittee on Civilian Crisis Prevention. 

In the negotiations to form a Grand Coalition of Chancellor Angela Merkel's Christian Democrats (CDU together with the Bavarian CSU) and the SPD following the 2013 federal elections, Weiss was part of the CDU/CSU delegation in the working group on families, women and equality, led by Annette Widmann-Mauz and Manuela Schwesig. From 2014 until 2018, she was one of the deputy chairs of the CDU/CSU parliamentary group, under the leadership of chairman Volker Kauder. 

In the coalition talks following the 2017 federal elections, Weiss was part of the working group on social affairs, this time led Andrea Nahles, Karl-Josef Laumann and Barbara Stamm. From 2018 until 2021, she served (alongside Thomas Gebhart) as one of two Parliamentary State Secretaries to the Federal Minister for Health Jens Spahn.

Since leaving government, Weiss has been serving on the Committee on Human Rights and Humanitarian Aid. In addition to his committee assignments, she has been a member of the German delegation to the Parliamentary Assembly of the Council of Europe (PACE) since 2022. In the Assembly, she serves on the Committee on Migration, Refugees and Displaced Persons.

Other activities 
 German Foundation for World Population (DSW), Member of the Parliamentary Advisory Board (–2021)
 Rotary International, Member

Political positions 
In June 2017, Weiss voted against her parliamentary group’s majority and in favor of Germany’s introduction of same-sex marriage.

In 2019, Weiss joined 14 members of her parliamentary group who, in an open letter, called for the party to rally around Merkel and party chairwoman Annegret Kramp-Karrenbauer amid criticism voiced by conservatives Friedrich Merz and Roland Koch.

Recognition 
 2016 – Paul Harris Fellowship

References

External links 

 Bundestag biography 

1958 births
Living people
Members of the Bundestag for North Rhine-Westphalia
Female members of the Bundestag
21st-century German women politicians
Members of the Bundestag 2021–2025
Members of the Bundestag 2017–2021
Members of the Bundestag 2013–2017
Members of the Bundestag 2009–2013
Parliamentary State Secretaries of Germany
Members of the Bundestag for the Christian Democratic Union of Germany